William Brent Christensen is a United States diplomat who served as the Director of the American Institute in Taiwan (AIT), the de facto embassy of the United States in Taiwan, from 2018 to 2021. Christensen's prior appointments include Deputy Director of AIT and Director of the State Department’s Office of Taiwan coordination.

Early life
Christensen is a native of Provo, Utah, and great-great-grandson of C. C. A. Christensen, a Danish American artist. He earned a BA in Chinese language and literature from Brigham Young University, an MA in East Asian Studies from George Washington University, and a DMD (Doctor of Dental Medicine) from the Oregon Health & Science University. Christensen served as a captain in the U.S. Air Force before joining the Foreign Service.

Diplomatic career

Christensen, since 2010, was Director of the State Department’s Office of Taiwan coordination, where he had a primary role in formulating U.S. policy toward Taiwan. In his posting at the U.S. Embassy in Beijing from 2007 to 2010, he served as Counselor for Environment, Science, Technology and Health, where he established the Embassy's air quality monitoring program and led working groups on avian influenza, HIV/AIDS and climate change.

Christensen also served as a Congressional Fellow on the staff of former U.S. Senator Olympia Snowe.

His earlier overseas postings include Beijing, Hong Kong and South Africa. He joined the Daniel K. Inouye Asia-Pacific Center for Security Studies as foreign policy advisor.

In August 2022 Christensen was appointed Chargé d'Affaires of the U.S. Mission to the International Civil Aviation Organization (ICAO), succeeding Chesley Sullenberger.

Honors and awards
On June 18, 2021, he was awarded an Honorary Doctor of Social Science from National Sun Yat-sen University (NSYSU).

On June 24, 2021, Christensen was awarded Grand Medal of Diplomacy by Taiwan's ministry of foreign affairs. 

On June 25, 2021, Christensen was conferred Presidential Office Order of the Brilliant Star with Grand Cordon by Taiwan's president Tsai Ing-wen.

References

Living people
American people of Danish descent
American diplomats
United States Department of State officials
Directors of the American Institute in Taiwan
Deputy Directors of the American Institute in Taiwan
Brigham Young University alumni
George Washington University alumni
Oregon Health & Science University alumni
United States Air Force officers
People from Provo, Utah
Year of birth missing (living people)
Recipients of the Order of Brilliant Star